Delicate Sound of Thunder is a live album by English band Pink Floyd. It was recorded over five nights at the Nassau Coliseum in Uniondale, New York, in August 1988 and mixed at Abbey Road Studios in September 1988. It was released on 22 November 1988, through EMI Records in the UK and Columbia Records in the US.

The album was remixed, restored and reissued in December 2019 for The Later Years 1987–2019 box set. This version included songs that were not present on the original release. In November 2020, it was given a standalone release.

Release and reissue
The album was released in 1988 as a double LP, double cassette, and a double CD, each format containing a slightly different track listing. The album includes many works from A Momentary Lapse of Reason as well as tracks from older Pink Floyd albums. The double LP release did not have "Us and Them" on the track listing. Both the double LP and the double cassette had "Wish You Were Here" between "Another Brick in the Wall (Part 2)" and "Comfortably Numb".

Although David Gilmour stated around the time of its release and on a radio interview in 1992 that the album contained no studio overdubbing whatsoever, he embellished the tracks during mixing with some extra acoustic guitar on "Comfortably Numb", according to engineer Buford Jones. In addition, some harmonies were replaced by studio re-takes: Richard Wright re-did his vocal on "Time" and Sam Brown replaced Rachel Fury's part in "Comfortably Numb" but the rest of the album is as performed at the shows.

Along with A Collection of Great Dance Songs, Delicate Sound of Thunder was reissued on 180g heavyweight vinyl LP in November 2017. Its artwork replicates that of the original 1988 LP release.

An expanded version of the live album was included in The Later Years 1987–2019 box set in 2019. Previously unreleased tracks include "Signs of Life," "A New Machine (Part 1)", "Terminal Frost", "A New Machine (Part 2)", "Welcome to the Machine", and "One Slip". All tracks were remixed for the 2019 reissue.

Commercial performance and reception
Delicate Sound of Thunder reached #11 on the Billboard 200. It was certified gold and platinum on 23 January 1989 and triple platinum in April 1997. In Canada, it was #57 in the 1989 year-end chart. 

In December 2020, the album reentered the Billboard album chart at #76, thanks to sales of the deluxe reissue.

Musician reviewer J. D. Considine wrote simply: "Further proof that you can't listen to a light show."

Delicate Sound of Thunder became the first album to be played in space, when Soviet cosmonauts took it aboard Soyuz TM-7. David Gilmour and Nick Mason attended the mission's launch.

Track listing

CD

2019 reissue

Delicate Sound of Thunder was reissued on CD on 13 December 2019 as part of the box set The Later Years 1987–2019 along with the film of the same name. The album has been remixed and remastered and includes tracks omitted from the original 1988 release. A standalone release was released on 20 November 2020 on 2 CD, triple LP, and CD/DVD/BD box set which includes the 2019 cut of the film.

In the 2019 remix, the songs "Sorrow", "On the Turning Away" and "Comfortably Numb" have longer guitar solos by Gilmour than in the 1988 original; "The Dogs of War" has a longer intro; "Money" has been condensed, removing Guy Pratt's bass solo and the female a cappella section; "Another Brick in the Wall (Part 2)" has extra elements (lifted from 1989 tour recordings) added in - most notably an extra "hey teacher!" between Gilmour's and Renwick's guitar solos; "Us and Them" has a piano added to the intro; much of the echo has been removed from Wallis' electronic drums during "Learning to Fly"; "Run Like Hell" has an extended intro and now includes Gilmour thanking the audience; and "Time" guitar's intro starts sooner within the "tic-tac" (as performed on Pulse) than the 1988 original.

"Learning to Fly", "Us and Them", and "Run Like Hell" from the 2019 remix are also included in the 2019 compilation album The Later Years 1987–2019 Highlights, released on 29 November 2019.

Track listing

Disc 1

 "Shine On You Crazy Diamond" (21 August 1988)
 "Signs of Life"  
 "Learning to Fly" (21 August 1988)
 "Yet Another Movie" (21 August 1988)
 "Round and Around" (21 August 1988)
 "A New Machine (Part 1)" 
 "Terminal Frost"  (20 August 1988)
 "A New Machine (Part 2)" 
 "Sorrow" (23 August 1988) 
 "The Dogs of War" (20 August 1988)
 "On The Turning Away" (21 August 1988)

Disc 2

 "One of These Days" (22 August 1988)
 "Time" (21/19 August 1988)
 "On the Run" 
 "The Great Gig in the Sky"  (21 August 1988)
 "Wish You Were Here" (23 August 1988)
 "Welcome to the Machine" 
 "Us and Them" (21 August 1988)
 "Money" (21 August 1988)
 "Another Brick in the Wall (Part 2)" (21 August 1988)
 "Comfortably Numb" (23 August 1988)
 "One Slip" 
 "Run Like Hell" (19 August 1988)

Personnel
Pink Floyd
David Gilmour – guitars, console steel guitar, lead vocals, production and 2019/2020 remixing
Nick Mason – drums, percussion
Richard Wright – keyboards, backing vocals, lead vocals on "Time" and "Comfortably Numb"

Additional musicians
Jon Carin – keyboards, programming, backing vocals
Rachel Fury – backing vocals
Durga McBroom – backing vocals
Scott Page – saxophones, oboe, guitar
Guy Pratt – bass guitar, backing vocals, co-lead vocals on "Another Brick in the Wall (Part 2)" and "Run Like Hell"
Tim Renwick – guitars, backing vocals
 Machan Taylor – backing vocals 
Gary Wallis – percussion, additional keyboards on "Comfortably Numb"

Production
Doug Sax – mastering (on original 1988 release)
David Gleeson – assistant engineering 
Buford Jones – engineering, mixing on original 1988 release 
Dimo Safari – band photography
Storm Thorgerson and Nick Marchant – cover design and graphics (on original 1988 release)
David Hewitt – remote recording
Andy Jackson  - Remastering and remixing on 2019/2020 re-release
Damon Iddins  - assistant remixing on 2019/2020 re-release
Steve Knee  - Cover photography on 2020 remixed/expanded reissue
Aubrey Powell of Hipgnosis  - supervising artwork on 2019/2020 re-release

Charts

Weekly charts

Year-end charts

Certifications and sales

References

Albums produced by David Gilmour
Albums with cover art by Storm Thorgerson
Pink Floyd live albums
1988 live albums
Columbia Records live albums
EMI Records live albums